This is the discography of Rotimi, an American actor and singer, consists of one album, three extended plays (EPs), three mixtapes, four singles and five music videos.

Albums

EPs

Mixtapes

Singles

As lead artist

Guest appearances

Music videos

Notes

References

Hip hop discographies
Discographies of American artists
Rhythm and blues discographies